History of the 1986 Western Soccer Alliance season.

History
After the success of the 1985 Western Alliance Challenge Series, three of the teams from that series, F.C. Seattle, F.C. Portland and the San Jose Earthquakes established the Western Soccer Alliance.  The Victoria Riptide, a participant in 1985, did not return but was replaced by the Edmonton Brick Men which had played games against the series team in 1985.  These teams were joined by the Hollywood Kickers, Los Angeles Heat and San Diego Nomads expanded the alliance from its Northwest Pacific roots into southern California.  The Alliance played a regular season schedule only.

Continuing the previous season's tradition of playing with a guest team - in that year, the Edmonton Brick Men, who had subsequently joined the league proper for 1986 - the Western Soccer Alliance this time sought two guest teams, turning this time to the United Kingdom. The two teams recruited were the English Football League First Division side Manchester City and Scottish Premier Division side Dundee, who each played one away match against each team and played no home fixtures. In the event, F.C. Portland were unable to play their game against Manchester City, instead rescheduling their game for later in the season, and replacing City - who had returned to England for the start of their own season - with a team composed of former Portland Timbers players.

League standings

Results

Points leaders

Honors
 MVP: Paul Caligiuri
 Leading goal scorer: Brent Goulet
 Leading goalkeeper: Lorenzo Caccialanza
First Team All League
Goalkeeper: Lorenzo Caccialanza
Defenders: Dale Ervine, Paul Krumpe, Martín Vásquez
Midfielders: Paul Caligiuri, Dennis Gunnel, Hugo Perez
Forwards: Chance Fry, Brent Goulet, Jeff Hooker, Mark Miller

Second Team All League
Goalkeeper: Todd Strobeck
Defenders: Mark Arquette, Jens Ole-Knudsen, Scott Murray, Tim Schulz
Midfielders: Drew Ferguson, Doug Swanson
Forwards: Tim Barto, Ross Ongaro, Rob Ryerson, Dzung Tran

References

The Year in American Soccer - 1986
1986 Western Soccer Alliance

Western Soccer Alliance seasons
3
Manchester City F.C.